The 1934 U.S. National Championships (now known as the US Open) was a tennis tournament that took place on the outdoor grass courts at the West Side Tennis Club, Forest Hills in New York City, United States. The tournament ran from 1 September until 12 September. It was the 54th staging of the U.S. National Championships and the fourth Grand Slam tennis event of the year. The men's and women's doubles events were held in Longwood Cricket Club in Chestnut Hill, Massachusetts.

Finals

Men's singles

 Fred Perry defeated  Wilmer Allison  6–4, 6–3, 1–6, 8–6

Women's singles

 Helen Jacobs defeated  Sarah Palfrey Cooke  6–1, 6–3

Men's doubles
 George Lott /  Lester Stoefen defeated  Wilmer Allison /  John Van Ryn 6–4, 9–7, 3–6, 6–4

Women's doubles
 Helen Jacobs /  Sarah Palfrey Cooke defeated  Carolin Babcock /  Dorothy Andrus 4–6, 6–3, 6–4

Mixed doubles
 Helen Jacobs /  George Lott defeated  Elizabeth Ryan /  Lester Stoefen 4–6, 13–11, 6–2

References

External links
Official US Open website

 
U.S. National Championships
U.S. National Championships (tennis) by year
U.S. National Championships
U.S. National Championships
U.S. National Championships
U.S. National Championships